Dalyrmple Hall is a building in Fraserburgh, Scotland, standing on Dalyrmple Street at its junction with Station Brae. Category C listed, in the Scottish baronial style, it dates to 1881. Its architects were Aberdeen-based Jenkins & Marr.

The building's prominent feature is its five-storey tower, extended in angular glass.

See also
 List of listed buildings in Fraserburgh, Aberdeenshire

References

1881 establishments in Scotland
Buildings and structures in Fraserburgh
Category C listed buildings in Aberdeenshire
Scottish baronial architecture